Mosun Belo-Olusoga (born 13 September 1957) is a Nigerian financial services industry practitioner, a credit and risk management specialist, and school owner.  She served as the chairman of Access Bank PLC and sits as a non-executive director on the board of Premium Pensions Limited, Action Aid and MTN Foundation. She has served as the Non-Executive Director of Asset and Resources Management, and Acting MD of Africa, Guaranty Trust Bank.


Education
Mosun studied Economics at the University of Ibadan and graduated with a bachelor's degree in 1979. In 1983, she became a chartered accountant finishing as the best qualifying accountant in her set. She also won the SWAN (Society of Women Accountants of Nigeria) award. In 1993, she became a Fellow of the Institute of Chartered Accountants of Nigeria. She is also an Honorary Fellow of the Chartered Institute of Bankers of Nigeria. She is an alumna of the Harvard Business School, Kellogg School of Management and Columbia Business School all in the United States, as well as International Institute for Management Development in Switzerland and INSEAD in France.

Career
She served as the Chairman of Access Bank PLC and sits as a Non-Executive Director on the board of Premium Pensions Limited, Action Aid and MTN Foundation. She has served as the Non-Executive Director of Asset & Resources Management, and Acting MD of Africa, Guaranty Trust Bank.
She was the chairman of Access Bank Group for the mandatory 12 years and retired in 2019 for Ajoritsedere Awosika.Mosun Belo-Olusoga 
has diverse experience in the financial industry. she is a Fellow, Institute of Chartered Accountants of Nigeria and also she is Honorary Fellow, Chartered institute of Bankers. she worked as a group head in Risk management and Corporate bank (Assistant General Manager). Commercial Bank General manager and Transaction Services Group Deputy General Manager. she is currently working as the KRC limited as the Principal consultant. she is the Chairman of Access Bank PLC. She is the director Action Aid, FCSL Asset Management Limited and Premium Pension Limited.

Personal life 
She is the founder of City of Knowledge Academy, Ijebu-Ode.

References

Living people
Nigerian financial businesspeople
University of Ibadan alumni
Harvard Business School alumni
Kellogg School of Management alumni
Columbia Business School alumni
Nigerian women in business
1957 births
Women bankers